Philip B. Downing (1857-1934) was an African American inventor from Providence, Rhode Island. He best known for his two most significant inventions, a type of street letter box;He is often cited as the inventor of the mailbox but this is obviously untrue as  Philadelphia merchant Albert Potts received a patent for the mailbox in 1858, he is also frequently incorrectly credited with the design of the modern street mailbox but this is also clearly false as this design belongs to James Van Dorne, and operating street railway switches. Philip had a long career in Boston, Massachusetts as a postal clerk. Retiring in 1927 after working for more than thirty years. In the late nineteenth century and the early twentieth century, at least five patents were filed by Philip with the United States Patent Office. The most significant and recognized inventions of his was for a street letter box (though not the first street letter box patient), and the operating street railway switches. Shortly after 1880 when Philip met and married Evangeline Howard, he had two children. Antonia Downing, and Philip Downing Jr. Around this time the census records indicated that Philip had moved to Boston, Massachusetts.

References
  

1857 births
1934 deaths
19th-century American inventors
African-American inventors
20th-century African-American people